Sikkim Cricket Ground is a cricket stadium in Rangpo, Pakyong District, Sikkim. It is the official cricket ground of Sikkim that has been leased to Sikkim Cricket Association in 2002 for 20 years by Government of Sikkim. The ground was established in 1997 when a match of Vijay Merchant Trophy was played between Sikkim Under-16s and Bihar Under-16s. Previously, the ground belonged to Sikkim Mining Corporation and was handed over to the Sikkim Cricket Association in 2002 to be developed as a cricket stadium. As of 2022, the Stadium is fully functional and Mining Cricket Stadium will host three Ranji Trophy matches, three CK Nayudu Trophy matches and two Cooch Behar Trophy matches in November - December 2022.

References

External links 
 Cricketarchive

Cricket grounds in Sikkim
Pakyong district
Sports venues in Sikkim
1997 establishments in Sikkim
Sports venues completed in 1997
20th-century architecture in India